James Paine (1717–1789) was an English architect.

Early life 
James Paine was probably baptised 9 October 1717 at Andover, Hampshire, the youngest of the five children of John Paine (d. 1727), carpenter, of Andover, and his wife, Jane Head (bap. 1684).

Whilst facts about Paine's early life are sparse, it is thought that he studied at the St Martin's Lane Academy, London, founded by William Hogarth in 1735 to allow artists to practise life drawing. Here he came into contact with many innovative architects, artists designers, including architect Isaac Ware.

Career 
It is thought that Ware introduced him to the third earl of Burlington and his circle of friends. Paine’s first professional job, aged only nineteen, was as the Clerk of Works supervising the building of Nostell Priory, Yorkshire (c.1737–1750), designed by Colonel James Moyser, a friend of Lord Burlington. Essentially a Palladian, Paine was to work on many other projects in the area including Heath House in the village of Heath in between Nostell Priory and Wakefield.

Paine lived in Pontefract whilst working at Nostell Priory, and whilst working on that project, he was also commissioned to design the Mansion House at Doncaster, Yorkshire between 1745 and 1748.

From the 1750s, he had his own practice, and designed many villas, usually consisting of a central building, often with a fine staircase, and two symmetrical wings. The most important house which he was involved with was Kedleston Hall, Derbyshire where he succeeded Matthew Brettingham from 1759 to 1760 and suggested the colonnaded hall, but he was himself displaced by Robert Adam, who altered his designs.

At around the same time, he designed the very grand stables at Chatsworth House in the same county. He was a favourite architect of the powerful Catholic families of the time. In the 1760s he was commissioned to rebuild Worksop Manor for the Duke of Norfolk as well as the new Thorndon Hall (1764–70) in Essex for Lord Petre and his house on Park Lane, London. From 1770 to 1776, he built New Wardour Castle in Wiltshire (which featured as the Royal Ballet School in the film Billy Elliot).

Paine held various posts, some sinecures, in the Office of Works culminating in appointment as one of the two Architects of the Works in 1780 but lost the post in a reorganisation in 1782. He was appointed High Sheriff of Surrey for 1783.

His practice declined in his later years as he refused to participate in the Neoclassical fashions established by the Adam brothers. He published much of his own work in his two volumes of Plans, elevations and sections of Noblemen and Gentlemen's Houses (1767 and 1783).

In 1789, Paine retired to France, where he died in the autumn.

Personal life 

Paine married twice. His first wife was Sarah Jennings, daughter and coheir of George Jennings of Pontefract. They married in March 1741 and had a son, the architect, sculptor, and topographical watercolourist James Paine (1745–1829).

After Sarah's death, Paine married Charlotte Beaumont (1722–1766), youngest daughter of Richard Beaumont of Whitley Beaumont, near Huddersfield. They were married by June 1748 and had two daughters, Charlotte (1751 – 31 October 1814) and Mary, known as 'Polly' (1753-1798). Charlotte married St John Charlton (April 1760 - 3 October 1802) on 22 December 1781 who later became High Sheriff of Shropshire in 1790 and the couple lived at Apley Castle. Mary married artist Tilly Kettle, with a dowry of £5,000.

In 1773 Paine bought the lease to Sayes Court, a country estate near Chertsey in Surrey. He became a justice of the peace for Middlesex in December 1776 and for Surrey in June 1777, and served as high sheriff of Surrey in 1785.

Portraits by Joshua Reynolds 
Paine was a friend of artist Joshua Reynolds and had designed a large gallery and painting room, with an elaborate chimney piece, for Reynold’s home in Leicester Fields, now Leicester Square, London. In 1764, Reynolds painted a joint portrait of James Paine father and son pictured above (now in the Ashmolean Museum, Oxford). The following year Reynold painted a matching portrait of Charlotte and her two daughters, Charlotte and Mary "Polly", possibly in exchange for in exchange for some of Paine’s architectural work at his home. This portrait is now in Lady Lever Art Gallery, Liverpool. The portraits were intended to be hung so that the father and son faced mother and daughters. Reynolds’s appointment book records an entry for their sittings:'17 July 1765 Mrs Pain , Miss Pain and Miss Polly Pain.' Then, on 25 July, 'Mrs Paine etc.' on 2 August 'Miss Paine' sat alone, and 'Mrs Paine' sat three days later. On 3 October the entry read: 'Mrs Paine & Co'. There were further appointments on 27 September, 27 November and 2 December, for 'Dog.'The portrait Mrs James Paine, and Her Daughters Charlotte Paine, b.1751, Later Mrs St John Charlton and Mary 'Polly' Paine, 1753–1798, Later Mrs Tilly Kettle) was exhibited twice in Yorkshire in late nineteenth century, and copies were made. It was eventually acquired by the art dealer C.J Wertheimer but when it was shown at Burlington House in 1908, it was catalogued as Portraits of the Misses Paine, their mother Charlotte having been painted out to increase its sale value. William Hesketh Lever paid £4520. 5s for in 1918. In 1935, the Lady Lever Art Gallery Trustees took the decision to remove the over painting and restored Mrs Paine to her rightful place.

Legacy 
In 2017, the Friends of Doncaster Mansion House led on the James Paine Festival, celebrating his life and work on the 300th anniversary of his birth.

List of architectural works
The following are major works attributed to Paine:

Nostell Priory, Yorkshire (c. 1737 – 1750) interiors completed and new wing added later by Robert Adam
Heath House, Yorkshire (1744–1745)
17 Cornmarket, Pontefract, Yorkshire, attributed (c. 1745–1750)
Hickleton Hall, Yorkshire, house and attributed stables (1745–1749)
 Mansion House, Doncaster (1745–48), which is one of only three civic mansion houses in England.
Cusworth Hall, Yorkshire, wings (1749–1753)
Wilsford Manor, Lincolnshire, additions (1749) demolished
Wadworth Hall, Yorkshire (c. 1749–1750)
5 Market Place, Pontefract, Yorkshire, attributed (c. 1750–1755)
High Melton Hall, Yorkshire, attributed (c. 1750)
Sprotbrough Hall, Yorkshire, unspecified work (c. 1750)
Milnsbridge Hall, Milnsbridge, Yorkshire, attributed (c. 1750)
Bierley Hall, Yorkshire, alterations and interiors (c. 1750) demolished
The Biggin, Bramham cum Oglethorpe, Yorkshire, alterations (c. 1750–1756)
Old Deanery, York, alterations (c. 1750)
Ormsby Hall, South Ormsby, Lincolnshire (1750–1756)
Felbrigg Hall. Norfolk, new service wing, internal decoration of main rooms (1751–1756)
Dinnington Hall, Dinnington, Yorkshire, attributed, wings (c. 1751–1757)
Kirkstall Grange, Headingley, Yorkshire (1752)
76 St Martin's Lane (Paine's own home) and Little Court, Castle Street, London (1752–1754) demolished
Cowick Hall, Yorkshire, external and internal alterations (1752–1760)
Whitley Beaumont, Yorkshire, redecoration of great hall and attributed gazebo (c. 1752–1754) demolished
Blagdon Hall, Northumberland, new stables (1753–1756)
Northumberland House, London, picture gallery (c. 1753–1757) demolished
Raby Castle, County Durham, partial remodelling, interiors, estate cottages and model farm (c. 1753–1760)
Gibside, County Durham, interior decoration of house (lost, as house is now a ruin), column of British Liberty and free standing chapel (1753–1767)
Alnwick Castle, Northumberland, reconstruction of keep, interior decoration (c. 1754–1768) largely destroyed by Anthony Salvin's remodelling in the 19th century
Coxhoe Hall, Coxhoe, County Durham, external and internal alterations (c. 1754) demolished
19 St. James's Square, London, remodelling of house (c. 1754–1760)
Hardwick Hall, Sedgefield, County Durham, various garden buildings (c. 1754–1757)
Dover House, Whitehall London (1754–1758) subsequently extended most notably by Henry Holland in 1787
Serlby Hall, Nottinghamshire (1754–1773)
Belford Hall, Northumberland (c. 1755–1756)
Wallington Hall, Northumberland, bridge (1755)
Gosforth House, Gosforth, Northumberland (1755–1764)
Middlesex Hospital, London (1755–1778) demolished
Chatsworth House, Derbyshire, new office wing and court (replaced by Sir Jeffry Wyatville), stable block, bridge in the park, bridge at Beeley, water mill and alterations to interiors of the house (1756–1767)
Norfolk House, London, alterations and repairs (c. 1756–1769)
Stoke Hall, Derbyshire, attributed (c. 1757)
Glentworth Hall, Glentworth, Lincolnshire, remodelling and new stables (1757–1766) largely demolished
Ravensworth Castle, County Durham, external and internal alterations (c. 1758) demolished 1808 and replaced by John Nash this later house has also been largely demolished
Cavendish Bridge (Wilne Ferry Bridge), Shardlow, Derbyshire (1758–1761)
Stockeld Park, Spofforth, North Yorkshire (1758–63)
Axwell House, County Durham (1758)
Bingley St Ives, Yorkshire (1759)
Kedleston Hall, Derbyshire (1759–1763) replaced Matthew Brettingham only to be replaced for the interiors and south front by Robert Adam
Bywell Hall, Northumberland (c. 1760)
Brocket Hall, Hertfordshire (c. 1760–1775) reconstruction of house, park lodges, bridge and probably the stables
Bramham Park, Yorkshire, attributed, pavilions each end of the stables and garden temple (c. 1760)
47 Leicester Square, London gallery and painting room for Sir Joshua Reynolds, attributed (also attributed to William Chambers (architect)) (1760–61)
Devonshire House, London, internal decoration (1760)
Worksop Manor, Nottinghamshire (1761–1767) demolished
Forcet Park, Yorkshire, Banqueting House (c. 1762) demolished
Arundel Castle, Sussex, minor repairs (1762)
14 Downing Street, London, alterations (c. 1763–1766) demolished
Sandbeck Park, Yorkshire remodelling and extension of house, new kitchen and stable blocks and garden buildings (c. 1763–1768)
Gopsall Hall, Gopsall, Leicestershire, garden temple (c. 1764)
The Duke of Norfolk's Palace, Norwich, Roman Catholic Chapel and priest's house (c. 1764) demolished
Thorndon Hall, Essex (1764–1770)
77–78 Strand, London (1765–73) demolished
Weston Park, Staffordshire, chimneypieces and attributed interior decoration (c. 1765–1766), bridge and temple of Diana (c. 1770)
Lumley House, South Audley Street, London, alterations (1766)
17 St. James's Square, London, chimneypiece (1766)
Lord Petre's House, Park Lane, London (1766–70) demolished
Melton Constable Hall, Melton Constable, Norfolk, attributed, chimneypieces (c. 1767)
North End House and adjoining house, Hampstead, Middlesex (1767)
St Paul's Walden Bury, Hertfordshire, attributed, north range (1767)
Burton house, Lincolnshire, alterations, new front range, stables and service building (1767–1771)
Britwell house, Britwell Salome, Oxfordshire, attributed, chapel ceiling (c. 1768)
Hare Hall, Romford, Essex (1768–1770)
79 Pall Mall, London (1769–71) demolished
Shrubland Park, Suffolk (c. 1769–1772) later remodelled by Sir Charles Barry
28 Sackville Street, London, chimneypiece (c. 1770)
Moor Park, Surrey, attributed, remodelling (c. 1770–1775)
Bagshot Park, Surrey, remodelled and interiors (1770–1772), rebuilt 1877 by Benjamin Ferrey
Cowick Hall, significantly remodelled and added a gatehouse and stables (1752–1760)
Chillington Hall, Staffordshire, bridge (c. 1770) and Gothic & Grecian temples (1772–1773)
St. Anne's Soho Parish Workhouse, London (1770–1771)
Wardour Castle, Wiltshire (1770–1776)
59 Strand, Coutts Bank, London, alterations (1770–1771) & (1781–83) demolished
Gaines Hall, Upminster, Essex (1771–1776)
Academy & Exhibition Rooms for the Society of Artists, Strand London (1771–1772) demolished
Sayes Court, Surrey, alterations (c. 1773)
Melbourne House, London, Chimneypieces (1773)
37 King Street, Covent Garden, London (1773–1774)
Hill House, Hampton, Middlesex, alterations (1774–1775)
 Richmond Bridge, London (1774–1777)
105 Pall Mall, London, alterations (1779–1781) demolished
Chertsey Bridge, Surrey (c. 1780–1785)
Kew Bridge, Surrey, replacement of original bridge, joint work with Paine's son (1783–1789) replaced by new bridge c. 1903
Walton Bridge, Surrey, second bridge (c. 1783) rebuilt
 Middleton Lodge, Middleton, West Yorkshire

Gallery of architectural works

References
Notes

Bibliography
 
 H.M. Colvin, A Biographical Dictionary of British Architects, 1600–1840 (1997) 

1717 births
1789 deaths
People from Andover, Hampshire
18th-century English architects
High Sheriffs of Surrey
Architects from Hampshire